Martin Černík (born 25 August 1976) is a Czech former snowboarder. He competed in the men's halfpipe event at the 2006 Winter Olympics.

References

External links
 

1976 births
Living people
Czech male snowboarders
Olympic snowboarders of the Czech Republic
Snowboarders at the 2006 Winter Olympics
People from Hořice
Sportspeople from the Hradec Králové Region